David William Hill (born 31 July 1978 in Blenheim, New Zealand) is a rugby union player. His position is fly-half. He spent most of his career playing for Waikato and the Chiefs. He also played for the All Blacks between 2001 and 2006, in which he has played 1 test and 2 games
In November 2006 he started playing for the Bristol Rugby club in the Guinness Premiership, and on 14 March 2008 announced that he'd leave the English club for a move to Toshiba Brave Lupus, a Japanese club, with other former Chiefs and Waikato player Steven Bates. In 2010 he signed with the Western Force with whom he spent one season.

He is the cousin of former New Zealand cricket captain Daniel Vettori.

Currently, Hill resides in Fuchu, Japan with Top League team Toshiba Brave Lupus under Australian coach Joe Barakat, with other New Zealand players Richard Kahui and Steven Bates.

External links

1978 births
New Zealand international rugby union players
Bristol Bears players
Living people
New Zealand rugby union players
Chiefs (rugby union) players
Waikato rugby union players
Toshiba Brave Lupus Tokyo players
Rugby union players from Blenheim, New Zealand
Western Force players
New Zealand expatriate rugby union players
Expatriate rugby union players in England
Expatriate rugby union players in Japan
Expatriate rugby union players in Australia
New Zealand expatriate sportspeople in England
New Zealand expatriate sportspeople in Australia
New Zealand expatriate sportspeople in Japan
People educated at Marlborough Boys' College
Rugby union centres